Wickliffe Stratton (1869–1936) was the fourth Attorney General of Washington from 1901 to 1905. A Republican and Wisconsin state Native, Stratton was 30 when elected, he had previously served as the South Bend City Attorney and Pacific County Prosecutor. While only in office for a single term his concerns were to preserve and promote the state's power to collect taxes.

Stratton took several of the towns of Washington to court to make sure they collected taxes on liquor sold and reported it to the state. He also successfully challenged the Northern Pacific Railroad and was able to establish that it was not exempt from paying taxes on the land in Washington state.

References

1869 births
1936 deaths
Washington (state) Attorneys General
20th-century American politicians